

This was the eleventh season of Barnes Football Club.  Barnes were surprisingly eliminated in the first round of the F.A. Cup by the debutants South Norwood, despite having far greater experience with association football rules.  Club captain Charles Morice played for England in the first international match against Scotland.

FA Cup

Friendly matches

Athletic Sports
 Date: 5 April 1873
 Venue: Field of J. Johnstone.
 Committee: O. D. Chapman (treasurer), W. M. Chinnery, F. C. Clarkson, H. Ellis, F. S. Gulston, C. J. Michod, C. J. Morice, E. C. Morley, J. Parker, J. Powell, D. M. Roberts, W. Rye, H. Ernest Solly (secretary), R. W. Willis
 Events: 100 yards, 100 yards handicap, 400 yards handicap, 1200(?) yards handicap, 2 miles handicap, one mile steeplechase, 5 miles steeplechase (run 22 March), 150 yards hurdle, mile and a half walking handicap, high jump, pole jump

Notes

Barnes F.C. seasons
Barnes